Emmanuel Biron (born 29 July 1988, in Lyon) is a French sprinter.

Achievements

References

External links

1988 births
Living people
French male sprinters
Athletes from Lyon
European Athletics Championships medalists
World Athletics Championships athletes for France
Mediterranean Games gold medalists for France
Mediterranean Games medalists in athletics
Athletes (track and field) at the 2013 Mediterranean Games